Borsch, or borscht, is a beetroot soup of East European origin.

Borsch,  borscht, borsh or borshch may also refer to:
 Bœrsch, a commune in France
 Borsh, a village in Albania
 BORSCHT or BORSHT, a telecommunications technology
 Borscht Corporation, a non-profit filmmaking organization
 Viktor Borshch (born 1948), Russian volleyball player

See also 
 Borsch (surname), for people with the German surname Borsch or Börsch
 Borș (disambiguation)
 Bosch (disambiguation)
 Ostern, or Borscht Western, a film genre